The Dwight D. Eisenhower Highway is a designation carried by the following roads:

Interstate 80 from San Francisco, California to I-25 in Cheyenne, Wyoming
Interstate 25 from Cheyenne, Wyoming to I-70 in Denver, Colorado
Interstate 70 from Denver, Colorado to I-270 in Frederick, Maryland
Interstate 270 from Frederick, Maryland to the Capital Beltway
Dwight D. Eisenhower National System of Interstate and Defense Highways

Interstate 25
Interstate 70
Interstate 80